Quercus pannosa is a species of oak native to south-central China. It is classified in subgenus Cerris, section Ilex.

References

pannosa
Trees of China
Endemic flora of China
Plants described in 1929